William Bonsall (December 31, 1923 – February 23, 2015) was an American gymnast. He competed in eight events at the 1948 Summer Olympics.

References

External links
 

1923 births
2015 deaths
American male artistic gymnasts
Olympic gymnasts of the United States
Gymnasts at the 1948 Summer Olympics
Gymnasts from Philadelphia
Penn State Nittany Lions men's gymnasts